Domni is a dance performed in West Bengal of India.

This dance form is mainly based on drama. Roles of husbands, wives, mothers, greedy moneylenders, peasant, etc. are main characters in this.

Dances of India
Culture of West Bengal